Pertusaria is a large genus of warty crustose lichens in the Pertusariaceae family. The fruiting bodies are usually modified apothecia that immersed in warts on the main body (thallus) with small holes for the spores to emerge, similar to ostioles, or are fully above and lecanorine (spore bearing discs surrounded by a ring of tissue similar to the tissue of the thallus.  Members of the genus are commonly called wart lichens.

The widespread genus contains over 500 species.

Classification in the large genus relies heavily on thallus chemistry to distinguish and classify species, some of which differ only in the presence or absence of a single secondary chemical. Lichexanthone, norlichexanthone, and their chlorinated derivatives are common in this genus.

Selected species

 Pertusaria amara
 Pertusaria californica
Pertusaria diluta
 Pertusaria favicunda
 Pertusaria lactea
 Pertusaria opthalmazia
 Pertusaria rubefacta
 Pertusaria subambigens
 Pertusaria velata
 Pertusaria xanthodes

References

 
Lichen genera
Pertusariales genera
Taxa named by Augustin Pyramus de Candolle
Taxa described in 1805